Dubs is the surname of:

 Adolph Dubs (1920–1979), U.S. ambassador to Afghanistan
 Alf Dubs, Baron Dubs (born 1932), British politician and former Member of Parliament
 Ivo Dubš (born 1974), Czech retired volleyball player
 Henry Dübs (1816–1876), German-born British businessman and engineer
 Homer H. Dubs (1892–1969), American sinologist and polymath
 Jakob Dubs (1822–1879), Swiss politician
 Rudolph Dubs (1837–1915), bishop of the Evangelical Association